E.J. Wells is an American musician, and songwriter. Part of the punk scene of the late 1970s, he is now considered to be a Gothabilly or Cowpunk musician.

Wells has been performing live, with various bands, since 1979. His most recent project was E.J. Wells and the Bleeding Deacons.

He released an album called Rhyolite on Halloween, 2002. Other performers on the album included Rick Nease and Chris Arduser of psychodots, Graveblankets, and The Bears]. The album received praise from other musicians such as Chip Kinman of Cowboy Nation, Chris Casello of The Starlight Drifters, and Scott Shriner of Weezer.

In 2003, Wells opened Happyland, a professional music recording studio.

In 2008, Wells and Dan O'Connor wrote several original songs for an episode of Law and Order: Criminal Intent called "Reunion," and starring veteran rocker Joan Jett.

Wells' song "Hearsedriver" has made him something of a celebrity in the hearse club community. Wells, along with Zachary Byron Helm of the Denver Hearse Association created a video for the song. The video got high ratings on YouTube and was showcased on hearseclub.com.

Wells abandoned his work on a new album, but in 2009 completed a video for his song "There's Something in the Graveyard," co-starring longtime friend Scott Shriner of Weezer.

As of 2019, it's rumored Wells is in the perfume business, operating with his Happyland Studio name.

References

External links
 Hearseclub.com
 Adrian Belew and the Bears Homepage
 Ruin Records
 Hearsedriver Video on YouTube
 Rick Nease Band Homepage
 Interview with E.J. Wells on Geetan.com
 The Professional Car Society

American country singer-songwriters
American rockabilly musicians
Living people
Year of birth missing (living people)